In the mathematical fields of linear algebra and functional analysis, the orthogonal complement of a subspace W of a vector space V equipped with a bilinear form B is the set W⊥ of all vectors in V that are orthogonal to every vector in W.  Informally, it is called the perp, short for perpendicular complement (probably, because \perp is the latex macro for ⊥).  It is a subspace of V.

Example
Let  be the vector space equipped with the usual dot product  (thus making it an inner product space), and let  with

then its orthogonal complement  can also be defined as  being

The fact that the spans of these vectors are orthogonal then follows by bilinearity of the dot product. Finally, the fact that these spaces are orthogonal complements follows from the dimension relationships given below.

General bilinear forms 

There is a corresponding definition of right orthogonal complement. This will be the case if  is a symmetric or an alternating form.

The definition extends to a bilinear form on a free module over a commutative ring, and to a sesquilinear form extended to include any free module over a commutative ring with conjugation.

Properties 
 If  then ;
 ;
 If  are subspaces of a finite-dimensional space  and  then

Inner product spaces 

This section considers orthogonal complements in an inner product space  
If  is any subset of an inner product space  then its  is the vector subspace

which is always a closed subset of  that satisfies  and if  then also  and  
If  is a vector subspace of an inner product space  then 
 
If  is a closed vector subspace of a Hilbert space  then 

Properties 

The orthogonal complement is always closed in the metric topology. In finite-dimensional spaces, that is merely an instance of the fact that all subspaces of a vector space are closed. In infinite-dimensional Hilbert spaces, some subspaces are not closed, but all orthogonal complements are closed.

Some other useful properties that always hold are the following. Let  be a Hilbert space and let  and  be its linear subspaces. Then:
 ;
 if  then ;
 ;
 ;
 if  is a closed linear subspace of  then ;
 if  is a closed linear subspace of  then  the (inner) direct sum.

The orthogonal complement generalizes to the annihilator, and gives a Galois connection on subsets of the inner product space, with associated closure operator the topological closure of the span.

Finite dimensions 

For a finite-dimensional inner product space of dimension  the orthogonal complement of a -dimensional subspace is an -dimensional subspace, and the double orthogonal complement is the original subspace:

Banach spaces
There is a natural analog of this notion in general Banach spaces. In this case one defines the orthogonal complement of W to be a subspace of the dual of V defined similarly as the annihilator

It is always a closed subspace of V∗. There is also an analog of the double complement property. W⊥⊥ is now a subspace of V∗∗ (which is not identical to V). However, the reflexive spaces have a natural isomorphism i between V and V∗∗. In this case we have 

This is a rather straightforward consequence of the Hahn–Banach theorem.

Applications
In special relativity the orthogonal complement is used to determine the simultaneous hyperplane at a point of a world line. The bilinear form η used in Minkowski space determines a pseudo-Euclidean space of events. The origin and all events on the light cone are self-orthogonal. When a time event and a space event evaluate to zero under the bilinear form, then they are hyperbolic-orthogonal. This terminology stems from the use of two conjugate hyperbolas in the pseudo-Euclidean plane: conjugate diameters of these hyperbolas are hyperbolic-orthogonal.

See also

Notes

References

Bibliography

External links 

 Orthogonal complement ; Minute 9.00 in the Youtube Video
 Instructional video describing orthogonal complements (Khan Academy)

Linear algebra
Functional analysis